The genus Eudyptula ("good little diver") contains two species of penguin, found in southern Australia, Tasmania, and New Zealand (including the Chatham Islands). They are commonly known as the little penguin, little blue penguin, or, in Australia, fairy penguin.

For many years, a white-flippered form of the little penguin found only in North Canterbury, New Zealand was considered either a separate species, Eudyptula albosignata, or just a subspecies, Eudyptula minor albosignata. Analysis of mtDNA revealed that Eudyptula falls instead into two groups: a western one, found along the southern coast of Australia and the Otago region of New Zealand, and another found in the rest of New Zealand. These two groups are now considered full species: Eudyptula novaehollandiae in Australia and Otago, and Eudyptula minor elsewhere. E. novaehollandiae probably arrived in New Zealand from Australia less than 500 years ago, following the local extinction of E. minor in Otago.

Classification
Order Sphenisciformes
 Family Spheniscidae
Genus Eudyptula
Eudyptula minor – little penguin
Eudyptula novaehollandiae – Australian little penguin

Extant Species

References

 
Bird genera
Penguins
Spheniscidae
Taxa named by Charles Lucien Bonaparte